Juvvigunta is a village in Marripudi mandal in Prakasam district of Andhra Pradesh in India.

References

Villages in Prakasam district